Ang Kwento Ni Mabuti is a 2013 Filipino drama film and the official entry to the first CineFilipino Film Festival.

The film was the first collaboration of the award-winning actress Nora Aunor and the award-winning director Mes de Guzman. The film was shot entirely in Aritao, Nueva Vizcaya. The dialogue of the film is entirely in Ilocano, to give the film its authenticity with English subtitles.

The film was also top-grosser of the first CineFilipino Film Festival.

Cast
 Nora Aunor as Mabuti de la Cruz
 Sue Prado as Nelia
 Mara Lopez as Lucia de la Cruz
 Arnold Reyes as Ompong de la Cruz.
 Ama Quiambao
 Josephina Estabillo as Guyang

Review

List of Festival Competed or Exhibited
 1st CineFilipino film Festival, Manila, Philippines
 The 20th Festival International des Cinémas d'Asie | Festival du Film Asiatique de Vesoul "Cinemas d'Asie" (11-18 Feb 2014), France
 6Th Cinema Rehiyon, Cagayan de Oro, Philippines (February 18–22, 2014)s

Awards and recognition

References

External links
 

2013 films
Philippine drama films
2010s Tagalog-language films